Bolesław Stanisław Kolasa (25 October 1920 - 16 April 2007) was a Polish former ice hockey player. He played for Pogoń Lwów, Wisła Krakow, and Polonia Bytom during his career. He also played for the Polish national team at the 1948 Winter Olympics

References

External links
 

1920 births
2007 deaths
Ice hockey players at the 1948 Winter Olympics
Olympic ice hockey players of Poland
Polish ice hockey forwards
Sportspeople from Lviv
TMH Polonia Bytom players